İnebolu District is a district of the Kastamonu Province of Turkey. Its seat is the town of İnebolu. Its area is 417 km2, and its population is 20,675 (2021).

Composition
There is one municipality in İnebolu District:
 İnebolu

There are 77 villages in İnebolu District:

 Akçay
 Akgüney
 Akkonak
 Aktaş
 Alaca
 Aşağıçaylı
 Atabeyli
 Ayvaköy
 Ayvat
 Başköy
 Bayıralan
 Belen
 Belence
 Belören
 Beyler
 Çamdalı
 Çaydüzü
 Çaykıyı
 Çiçekyazı
 Çubuk
 Deliktaş
 Deresökü
 Dibek
 Dikili
 Doğanören
 Durupınar
 Erenyolu
 Erkekarpa
 Esenyurt
 Evrenye
 Göçkün
 Gökbel
 Gökçevre
 Güde
 Güneşli
 Hacıibrahim
 Hacımehmet
 Hamitköy
 Hayrioğlu
 Hörmetli
 İkiyaka
 İkizler
 Kabalar
 Kabalarsökü
 Karabey
 Karşıyaka
 Kayaelması
 Keloğlu
 Korupınar
 Köroğlu
 Köseköy
 Kuzluk
 Örtülü
 Özbaşı
 Özlüce
 Sakalar
 Salıcıoğlu
 Soğukpınar
 Sökü
 Şamalı
 Şamaoğlu
 Şeyhömer
 Taşburun
 Taşoluk
 Toklukaya
 Uğrak
 Uluköy
 Uluyol
 Üçevler
 Üçlüce
 Yamaç
 Yaztepe
 Yolüstü
 Yukarıçaylı
 Yukarıköy
 Yunusköy
 Yuvacık

References

Districts of Kastamonu Province